Hamza Mouali (born January 16, 1998) is an Algerian professional footballer who plays as a left-back for  MC Alger.

Career
Mouali made his senior debut with Paradou AC on August 26, 2017, as a starter in a 2–1 loss to USM Algiers.
In 2022, he signed a loan contract with Stade Lavallois.
In 2023 he joined MC Alger.

References

External links
 

Living people
1998 births
Footballers from Algiers
Algerian footballers
Association football fullbacks
Algerian Ligue Professionnelle 1 players
Ligue 2 players
Championnat National 3 players
Paradou AC players
Stade Lavallois players
Algerian expatriate footballers
Algerian expatriate sportspeople in France
Expatriate footballers in France